The 2004–05 season was Galatasaray's 101st in existence and the 47th consecutive season in the Süper Lig. This article shows statistics of the club's players in the season, and also lists all matches that the club have played in the season.

Squad statistics

Players in / out

In

Out

Süper Lig

Standings

Türkiye Kupası

Second round

Third round

Quarter final

Semi final

Final

Friendlies

Attendance

References

Galatasaray S.K. (football) seasons
Galatasaray S.K.
2004–05 in Turkish football
2000s in Istanbul
Galatasaray Sports Club 2004–05 season